Dmytro Kveselevych (16 May 1935 – 22 February 2003) was a translator and lexicographer; author of nine dictionaries, two monographs and more than hundred memoirs.

Early years 
Dmytro Kveselevych was born on 16 May 1935 in Zhytomyr. His father was an English teacher in the secondary school № 23 and taught English and German at the   simultaneously. His mother also worked there as a technical secretary. His first teacher was his father but after Zhytomyr liberation the young translator-to-be went to the third grade in school № 8.  He wrote: «My father prepared me for the first two grades». He was also educated in secondary school №25, which he graduated with distinctions in 1952. Dmytro Kveselevych joined YCL, he was interested in languages and literature, and was good at painting.
He studied on the Foreign language faculty in Zhutomyr. Because of his successful studying he was honored with Stalin`s grand. V.B. Pivnenko played a major role in Kveselevych`s career as a linguist. She sent his work to B.O. Ilyish to Leningrad. This work was highly rated. In the Institute he became a member of Communist Party and graduated university with honours.

Teaching and translating career 
In 1956 he went to Korostyshiv where he worked as an English teacher in the secondary school №2. In 1956 in Zhytonyr he run the lecturer group of Regional Committee YCL Ukraine and soon in June due to the assignment of General Stuff Forces of Soviet Union he went to Iraq, where he worked as a translator in Baghdad in Military Commission team. For the well-done work he received gratitude from the Minister of Armed Forces of Soviet Union marshal Rodion Malinovsky.

In September 1961 he was hired as a teacher on the foreign language faculty.

Dictionary work 
He started his lexicographical work. In 1998 «Russian language» edition published Russian-English phrasebook( it contains 7 thousand phraseological units and more than nine thousand examples of their contextual translation. He worked under this project for 20 years.
In 1975 the handbook for foreign students «700 Russian idioms and set Phrases» was published.

Achievements 
On 6 October 1976 in Kiev in the Institute of Iinguistics named after O.Potebnya he defended the thesis for achieving a degree of scientist Cand. Phil. Sci. 
On 15 August 1986 Dmytro Kveselevych achieved a degree of Doctor of Philology.
On 26 April Higher Attestation Commission of SU gave him a title of professor. 
In 1992 he headed the English philology department. That year he was awarded with a medal «Veteran Labour» for his perennial and intensive work.
In 1995 on the foreign language faculty was opened a department of translation.

Private life 
Dmytro Kveselevych had a wife Valentina Sasina and five children. His wife conducted teaching and science. She was a head of English philology department.  The couple lived together for 42 years.

Commemoration 
Dmytro Kveselevych died on 22 February 2003 in Zhytomyr. He is buried at the Russian graveyard near to his parents. In the building of Foreign Language Institute named after Ivan Franko, there is a plaque for Dnytro Kveselevych.

Research papers 
Workshop on lexicology of modern English (Zhytomyr, 2000)
Article «Functional field English carriers»(Tyymen, 1989)
One-word idioms in English and Ukrainian languages@(K.,1995)
“Linguocultural Aspects of Compiling” A Dictionary of Unconventional Russian” (К., 1996).

Sources 
https://web.archive.org/web/20131215113419/http://famous-people.pp.ua/dmytro-kveselevych/
http://studentam.net.ua/content/view/8492/97/

1935 births
2003 deaths
Ukrainian lexicographers
Teachers of English as a second or foreign language
20th-century lexicographers